Henry Kelly (born 17 April 1946) is an Irish radio and television broadcaster, actor and journalist.

Early life
Kelly was born in Athlone, County Westmeath, Ireland, and educated at Belvedere College SJ, and at University College Dublin, where he was auditor of the Literary and Historical Society. Whilst at university he wrote theatre reviews for The Irish Times.

Journalism
After graduating from University College Dublin with a degree in English in 1968, he became a journalist with The Irish Times, and was swiftly promoted to the post of its Belfast-based Northern Editor in 1970, at the start of civil unrest and The Troubles in Northern Ireland, a post which he held for five years. During his time in Northern Ireland he published the book How Stormont Fell (1972), which is still highly regarded in its field. In 1976 he left The Irish Times and moved to London to work as a reporter for the British Broadcasting Corporation on its Radio 4 The World Tonight programme.

Television
In 1980, in a complete career change at the age of 34, Kelly abandoned journalism and choose to pursue another career in television, presenting light entertainment shows. Whilst at university, Kelly had been a friend of the family of Terry Wogan, and was drawn to try to emulate Wogan's career path by the professional success that Wogan was experiencing by the late 1970s with the BBC.

In 1981, Kelly secured a co-presenter slot on the United Kingdom's ITV television channel with the London Weekend Television prime-time light entertainment show Game for a Laugh, which was a sufficient ratings success to make him a household name in the country. He remained with the show until 1983. In June 1983, Kelly joined TV-am, and became the host of the Saturday edition of "Good Morning Britain" with Toni Arthur. He was also a regular stand-in presenter on the weekday programme and presented "Summer Sunday" over the years. He left TV-am in 1987, and from 1987 to 1996 he presented Going for Gold, a lunchtime television quiz game show broadcast on BBC1 with contestants from across Europe.

In 1988 he briefly returned to journalism and once chaired After Dark. He had previously appeared on that programme discussing the activities of the Northern Ireland Civil Rights Association, which he had witnessed first hand as a journalist in the early 1970s.

In 2000 he appeared as a quiz show host in the final two episodes of the Victoria Wood sitcom dinnerladies. Kelly had also previously worked with Wood on her show Victoria Wood: As Seen on TV in the mid 1980s. He also appeared occasionally on Sky News television reviewing the Sunday morning newspapers.

Radio
In 1992, Kelly was one of the launch presenters of Classic FM, initially presenting the weekday mid-morning show from 9 am to 12 noon. He then moved on to the Breakfast Show, until replaced by Simon Bates in June 2003. He returned between 2006 and 2008 to present a three-hour show on Sunday mornings.

In September 2003, Kelly took up the Drivetime slot on London news-and-talk station LBC 97.3. In February 2004 he declared himself bankrupt thirteen years after the Inland Revenue had sued him for the non-payment during the 1980s of income tax and national insurance contributions. At the end of 2004, Kelly and some of LBC's most experienced presenters, such as Brian Hayes and Angela Rippon, did not have their contracts renewed.

Kelly spent two weeks in June 2005 presenting the late show on BBC Radio London 94.9, and in September 2005 took over the weekday mid-morning show on BBC Radio Berkshire from 10 am to 1 pm. He later presented a Saturday mid-morning show for the station until 2015.

Other work
In 2013, Kelly presented a series of filmed adverts for a Golders Green used car dealership and garage. He has also been the narrator for most of Video 125's Driver's Eye Views of Irish railways.

Personal life
Kelly is married to the journalist Karolyn Shindler, and resides in Hampstead in North London. He has two adult children. He enjoys golf. In 1994 he won the inaugural William Roache Charity Classic Invitational, held at Woburn.

Publications
How Stormont Fell (1972), 
Classic FM Musical Anecdotes (1998),

References

External links

Henry Kelly at the British Film Institute

1946 births
Living people
Alumni of University College Dublin
Auditors of the Literary and Historical Society (University College Dublin)
Classical music radio presenters
Irish expatriates in the United Kingdom
Irish game show hosts
Irish radio DJs
Irish radio presenters
Irish television presenters
The Irish Times people
People educated at Belvedere College
People from Athlone
Television presenters from the Republic of Ireland